Cadi Mané is a Guinea Bissau doctor and politician who served as minister of defence from 2014 to 2015.

Career
Mané is a military doctor. She was appointed as Defence Minister in the government of Prime Minister Domingos Simões Pereira on 4 July 2014. She served until August 2015, when the government was dismissed by President José Mário Vaz.

References

Living people
Bissau-Guinean Ministers of Defense
Female defence ministers
Women government ministers of Guinea-Bissau
21st-century women politicians
Women physicians
Bissau-Guinean military doctors
Year of birth missing (living people)